Frederick Feigl (August 24, 1863 − 10 December 1933) was a German-American publisher and a military officer.  He was the publisher of The Tammany Times (later renamed The Political Review), a weekly magazine which carried various departments such as social news and a women's section, but was primarily devoted to the defense of Tammany Hall.

Feigl was born in Bethnal Green, London, to Austrian-German parents, He emigrated to the United States in 1871 as a German citizen but returned to England. He was likely the Frederick Feigl admitted to the Westminster Jews Free School in May 1875, when it was noted his previous school was in the United States. In 1887, he returned to the United States.

He moved to Texas, and became a reporter on The Houston Post, moving to New York in 1892. He became managing editor of Texas Siftings, a humor magazine.  In 1898, he married Jane Mauldin.

He enlisted with the Texas National Guard and saw service with the Texas Rangers on the Mexican frontier. In World War I he became chief of the Bureau of Special Service, a branch of the New York city police that arrested people considered disloyal. His son, Jeff Feigl, was the first American artillery officer killed in World War I.

Footnotes 

1863 births
1933 deaths
People using the U.S. civilian title colonel
American publishers (people)
Members of the Texas Ranger Division
Texas National Guard personnel
American people of Austrian descent
American people of German descent
British emigrants to the United States